The Special Forces Command (German: Kommando Spezialkräfte) is an infantry corps of the Swiss Armed Forces specialised in rapid offensive operations, intel gathering and operations in urban areas, open fields and other difficult terrains, capable of acting on short notice. Grenadiers are subjected to considerable physical strain, applicants are required to be in excellent physical conditions, and recruits are chosen through a strict selection process.

The Grenadiers have been part of the Grenadier Command 1 since the "Army XXI" reform in late 2004, before which Grenadier units were integrated in other regiments. Grenadier Command 1, subordinated to the "Reconnaissance Formations of the Armed Forces and Grenadiers", is headquartered in Rivera. The Grenadiers' motto, shared with many other military institutions and most famously with the US Marines, is "Semper Fidelis".

History

Soldiers denominated "grenadiers" have long been part of Switzerland's military tradition: even before the 19th century, grenadiers served as part of the cantonal contingents of the Swiss Confederacy. Modern Grenadiers were formed in the early 1940s, originating from the "Infantry Pioneers" trained by Chief instructor Matthias Brunner, the commander of a riflemen company who developed a close combat technique in the shooting schools of Walenstadt. This company, made up of volunteers, faced a stricter and more intensive training than other infantry companies.

In 1943, General Henri Guisan, convinced of the necessity of shock troops specially trained for close combat, decided to form a similar company in each of the 37 infantry regiments of the army. In the same year, the designation of "Grenadiers" replaced that of "Pioneers", marking the birth of the corps. Also in 1943, the first recruit school of Grenadiers were held in Locarno and Solduno. After the war, the makeshift training grounds were relocated twice, first to Losone, but after complains about having a military installation in a touristic area they were moved again to Isone, where they remain to this day.

In 1968, to answer the necessity of a specific training for combat and deployment in difficult terrains, units of Mountain Grenadiers were created. In 1970 Airborne Grenadiers, while subordinated to aviation troops, were first trained in the Grenadier recruit school. In 1971, companies of motorised Grenadiers were created. In the 1970s, the guerrilla tactics first introduced in 1943 were resumed and adapted with the name of "hunting war". The Army XXI reform of 2004 reassembled all Grenadier formations of the previous "Army 95" model in the Grenadier Command 1.

Structure
The Special Forces Command is an infantry formation of about 3,000 soldiers and consists of the following units:

Training
The recruitment process of Grenadier units takes place one year before recruit school, and generally matches the ones of other corps, with the exception that one must volunteer to become a Grenadier. Those interested are subjected to comprehensive medical and psychological tests.

Recruit school, extending over a period of 23 weeks, is very demanding, both physically and psychologically. Those who, during the first 11 weeks, prove incapable of the necessary performances, are moved to other incorporations. Training for NCOs and officers begins after 9 weeks of recruit school, who undertake respectively 41 and 56 additional weeks of grade-specific training.

Equipment
Additional Grenadier courses offered to recruits include basic training of shotguns (notably the Remington 870, which is designated as MzGw 91, Mehrzweckgewehr 91) and for marksmen/snipers (for the 8.6 mm Sako TRG) (SSGw 04, Scharfschützengewehr 04) and 12.7 mm PGM Hécate II rifle 12.7mm PGw 04 (12.7 mm Präzisionsgewehr 04 ) and survival techniques.

The Grenadiers will also be issued with plate carriers to replace their LBE gear.

References

External links 
 Special Forces Command (SFC)

Military units and formations of Switzerland
Military units and formations established in 1943
Special forces of Switzerland